The Legend of Xiao Chuo is a 2020 Chinese television series based on the novel Yan Yun Tai by Jiang Shengnan. It stars Tiffany Tang in the title role, along with Shawn Dou, Charmaine Sheh and Jing Chao. The series chronicles the life of legendary Empress Xiao Yanyan.

Plot 
This is the story of Xiao Yanyan, also known as Xiao Chuo from the Liao dynasty.

Xiao Yanyan (portrayed by Tiffany Tang) is the third daughter of prime minister Xiao Siwen and Princess Yan. She falls in love with the young lieutenant Han Derang (portrayed by Shawn Dou) and the couple eventually decide to marry each other. However, their promise of love is severed when Xiao Siwen agrees to let Yelü Xian (portrayed by Jing Chao) take Yanyan as his empress after the latter succeeds the throne. Xiao Yanyan's relationship with sisters Xiao Hunian (portrayed by Charmaine Sheh) and Wuguli (portrayed by Lu Shan) also deteriorate due to the power struggle between the women's husbands, who each believe they have a legitimate claim to the throne.

When Yelu Xian was critically ill, he entrusted her the government and she eventually became the most important woman in the history of Liao. She broke political boundaries, pushed the public to implement the New Deal, completed the process of the Sinicization of the Liao dynasty from the original tribe to the feudal dynasty, promoted the integration of the Khitan and the Han people, and made the Liao dynasty prosperous and continuous. Emotionally, she pursued bravely - disregarding the widow's voice and the world's material opinions.

Cast

Main

Supporting

People around Xiao sisters
Liu Yijun as Xiao Siwen, King of Wei
Prime Minister of the Liao Dynasty and a father of the Xiao sisters. For the sake of the country, he agrees to marry his youngest daughter to Yelü Xian. He is later assassinated while accompanying Xian on a hunt.
Lu Shan as Xiao Wuguili, Queen of Zhao
An innocent and naive but willful girl. The second of the Xiao sisters, married to Yelü Xiying and mother of Liulishou. Trying to avenge her husband's death, she conspires with the Queen of Ji to poison Yanyan, but later commits suicide after learning that the attempt was unsuccessful.
Wang Ziquan as Xiao Dalin, King of Lanling County
Xiao Siwen's nephew and Xiao sisters' first cousin. He dies getting shot by the Southern Armies.
Sheng Yilun as Talan A'bo
A slave Xiao Hunian falls in love with since he is rescued by her while in danger. He later dies after trying to protect her.
Gong Wanyi as Xiao Hailan
Xiao Taogu's daughter and Xiao sisters' niece.
Feng Qilong as Xiao Haizhi
Xiao Siwen's nephew who turns against him. He is later executed by Xiao Yanyan.
Gu Caobin as Xiao Haili
Xiao Siwen's other nephew who also turns against him alongside Xiao Haizi. He is also executed by Xiao Yanyan.
Ren Xihong as Xiao Taogu
Xiao Hailan's father.
Li Junwei as Xiao Weiyin
Xiao Pusage's father.

People around Han Derang
Meng Ziyi as Li Si, Mrs. Han
A noble lady who is in love with Han Derang. She later becomes his wife but dies accidentally consuming poisoned alcohol.
Jiang Kai as Han Kuangsi, King of Yan
Han Derang's father and Xiao Siwen's confidant. He is an Imperial physician.
Juan Zi as Madame Han, Queen of Yan
Han Derang's mother and biggest supporter.
Deng Ying as Madame Li
Li Si's mother.
Zhuyuan as Madame Xiao Han
Han Derang's sister and Xiao Pusage's mother by marriage to Xiao Weiyin.

Imperial Household
Tan Kai as Yelü Yanchege, King  Taiping, then King of Qi (Imperial Uncle)
Xiao Hunian's husband and Yelü Jing's younger brother and one of the main antagonist. An ambitious man who likes power and after his nephew, Yelü Xian ascended the throne, he become the Imperial Uncle. Despite his ambition, he truly loves Hunian and always take care of her in every possible way. However, when he tries to conspire, he got hit by an arrow from Xiao Yanyan and finally died in Hunian's arms.
Ji Chen as Yelü Xiyin, King of Zhao
Xiao Wuguili's husband and one of the main antagonist, also the cousin of Yelü Xian. He was spared by emperor Yelü for the plot to take over the throne with his father but his father was made to die. Later his love and marriage with Wuguili was not sincere at first, and just using her, for her families power. However, after being together for a long time, he then sincerely loved her and had a son named Liulishou. Later, he got exiled to Zuzhou after he tried to rebel for the Emperor's throne. Not long after that, he then died along with his son.
Shao Bing as Great King Wuzhi, the oldest member in the Liao Imperial Family.
Li Ning as Yelü Jing, the Emperor
One of the main antagonist, Yelü Yanchege's older brother and Yelü Xian's uncle. He also responsible for Xian's father's death. He wasn't intimate with any women, due to his fickle feelings and tempestuous, which made him also suffer from severe paranoia and delusions of people wanting to kill him for his throne, which resulted in him killing many guards, eunuchs, court maids and others around him. Due to this, he is eventually killed by his own guards.
Wang Yuanke as Empress Zhen
The former Empress of Liao and Yelü Zhimo's birth mother. She is the only Han Empress Consort in Liao's history.
Simon Lian as Yelü Zhimo, King of Ning
Yelü Xian's half little brother and Empress Zhen's son. However, he has an affair with one of Yelü Jing's maid, An Zhi and after it was discovered by emperor Jing, he lost one of his eye to protect An Zhi and then become half blind, plus was castrated for sleeping with the emperors maid. After An Zhi's death, he started to live alone in his Mansion and became a Buddhist monk.
Zhao Yuanyuan as An Zhi, Queen of Ning
One of emperor Yelü's personal palace maids that's in love with Yelü Zhimo. However, She is killed by Zhimo's own hands after the emperor Yelü found out about their affair.
Monica Mok as Yileilan, Queen of Ji
Yelü Dilie's wife. Later, she blamed Han Derang for her husband's death in the battlefield. Then, Xiao Yanyan gave her a poisoned wine to kill herself.
Wang Junpeng as Yelü Dilie, King of Ji
Yelü Jing and Yelü Yanchege's half little brother. He often look down on himself because of his biological mother's status just a maidservant. He has ambitions of ascending the throne and become the Emperor of Liao. Because of his greed, he got ambushed and killed by Song army along with his son.
Wang Huichun as Yelü Lihu
Yelü Xiyin's father and Xiao Wuguili's father in-law. He was later made to drink poisoned wine under orders from  the emperor Yelü, when his plot to take over the throne was discovered.
Zhou Siyu as Yelü Liulishou
Xiao Wuguili and Yelü Xiyin's son. He later died along with his father when try to make a rebellion in Shangjing.
Rong Zixi as Consort Xige
An arrogant and proud young lady who selected as Yelü Xian's concubine because she is Master Nüli's niece. She always jealous when sees or hears if Xiao Yanyan and Yelü Xian are together. She urged the two Dowager Consorts and forced them to tell that Xiao Siwen was dead to Xiao Yanyan.  Later, Xian ordered her to be sent to the cold palace after it was discovered that she participated in Yelü Yanchege's rebellion. She eventually died in the cold palace.
Ren Hongmo as Yelü Daoyin, King of Shu
Xiao Wuguili and Queen of Ji's hand, he wanted to conspire and inspire a rebellion to fulfill his own wish. He was later made to drink poison under the orders from Empress Dowager Xiao Yanyan, after Xiao Wuguili's death.
Sun Yali as Yelü Hugudian, Princess of Qin
Yelü Xian's younger sister and Xiao Chuoli's wife.
Wang Churan as Yu Xiao, Consort of Bohai
Yelü Xian's later concubine, a lady expert in Medicine and after becoming his concubine, she bore him a son. She later killed herself after realizing that she couldn't cure her husband's illness.
Crystal Zhang as Consort Puge, Yelü Ruan's widow concubine.
Huang Xiaoge as Consort Chuoli, Yelü Ruan's widow concubine.
Yang Anqi as Yelü Ting, Princess Yicheng
Yelü Xiang's daughter and later married with Li Jiqian.
Wang Yang Mei Zi as Queen of Shu
Chen Hao as Wenshunu, Yelü Longxu, King of Liang, Xiao Yanyan and Yelü Xian's son.
Cary Ye as teenage Wenshunu
Leo Pei as child Wenshunu
Yang Yutong as Xiao Pusage, Yelü Longxu's wife. She is Han Derang's niece.
Tao Yixi as young Xiao Pusage
Hang Chengyu as Yelü Wage, Yelü Dilie's son.

Prime ministers and other Yelü peoples
Ruan Shengwen as Yelü Xiuge
One of Yelü Xian's trusted person in the court and Yelü Xiezhen's uncle. He later died due to his illness near the end of the episodes.
Tim Yu as Yelü Xiezhen, Great King Nanyuan
A bright young man who is in love with Xiao Hailan, Xiao Yanyan's niece.
Guan Yajun as Gao Xun
A hungry-power and manipulative man who is jealous with Xiao Siwen's power. To defeat him, he provokes Xiao Haili and Xiao Haizi to assassinate him. He later died after stabbed by Xiao Dalin in his rebellion with Yelü Yanchage.
Leo Jiang as Master Nüli
Consort Xige's uncle and likes Gao Xun, he also jealous with Xiao Siwen's power. For secure his position, he does the same like Gao Xun and joining Yelü Yanchege's rebellion. He later died after get a fire-archery shot by Yelü Xiuge.
A Sihan as Yelü Molugu, Yelü Hugu's son and Xiao Yanyan's rejected suitor.
Xue Hanyu as young Yelü Molugu
Han Dong as Yelü Hugu
Yelü Molugu's father who later killed by Han Derang after try to killed the Dowager Empress Yanyan.
Xiao Moge as Yelü Longxian, King of Ping
Chen Tao as Yelü Shao, King of Wu
Zhang Jinyuan as Shi Fang, Prime Minister of Beifu.
Guo Jun as Yelü Chage, King Taining
One of Yelü Yanchege's person who helps him in killed the former Emperor Yelü Ruan.
Zhao Qiang as Yelü Xidi
Hou Zhuyuan as Liu Zigu
Tian Kai as Yelü Xianshi, Envoy of the North Privy Council.
Jin Youming as Yelü Sha, Prime minister of Nanfu.

Maids
Zhang Gong as Diligu, an Imperial Physician.
Huang Hai as Shuanggu
Mu Leen as Liang Ge, Xiao Yanyan's attendant after entered palace.
Yu Menghan as Qing Ge, Xiao Yanyan's attendant who gives a poisonous alcohol to Han Derang and Li Si. She later saved by Xiao Hunian, Yanyan's oldest sister.
Han Shuo as Xinning, Han Derang's loyal bodyguard
Li Yizhen as An Xi, Xiao Hunian's attendant.
Cao Feiran as Fu Hui, Xiao Hunian's attendant.
Zhang Qiaoqiao as Chong Jiu, Xiao Wuguili's attendant who killed by Yelü Xiyin.
Ma Mengqiao as Gui Yin, Xiao Wuguili's attendant.
Fu Fengnan as Po'er, Yelü Xian's eunuch.
Shi Danjiang as Hu Si, Xiao Siwen's subordinate.
Yu Hongliang as Gao Liu, Yelü Yanchege's subordinate.
Zhu Feng as Nianmugun, Yelü Yanchege's confidant and trusted assistant.
Rachel Yang as Yun'er, Li Si's maid.
Katherine Zhao as Fang'er, Li Si's attendant.
He Long as Salan, Yelü Xiyin's butler.
Ma Mengqiao as Xiao Wuguli's maid who misunderstood with her due to an incident.
Meng Zhichao as Hulie
Ayden Wong as Chu Bu, at first was Yelü Yanchege's assistant, but later become Yelü Xian's assistant.
Patty Hou as Zi Su, Queen of Ji's maid.
Luo Ning as A Gu, Yelü Xiezhen's bodyguard.
Xie Shanshan as Tabu, An Zhi's maid who got poisoned by her own.

Others
Yang Chen as Bai Hai
Huang Chengcheng as Ji Geng
Zhang Keyan as Nai Wanshi
Henry Han as Xiao Chuoli, Princess of Qin's husband.
Yin Zeqiang as Shi Lu
Shen Xuewei as Wang Jizhong
Yang Di as Li Zha
Pang Xiandong as Lu Cun
Zhang Zhenjiang as Lu Duan's father
Wen Wei as Lu Duan's mother
Zhou Zixin as Kou Kui
Da Qing as Tuo Li
Wilson Wang as Hu Er'bo

Rilian Tribe
Huo Zhengyan as Abohe
The new head of Rilian Tribe and Han Derang's best friend when he goes to travelling because Derang once save his life.

Special appearances
Jin Jia as Yelü Ruan, the former Emperor of Liao who killed by Yelü Jing. He is Yelü Xian, Yelü Zhimo, and Yelü Hugudian's father.
Zhou Yanyan as Xiao Gu, a Witch Doctor.
Liu Wei as Liu Jieli
Chen Qi as Yelü Hou
Li Tongdong as Xiheshuonu
Chen Entao as Wanyanyuanke
Yue Hailong as a Jurchen man
Liu Shuai as King of Gaoli
Shi Qiang as King of Bohai
Wang Rong as King of Zubu
Jiang Bingwen as Head of Wamo
Zheng Chen as Head of Shiwei
Shi Yixuan as Yuwan
Zhang Zhenjiang as Lu Rui's father
Shi Danjiang as Husi
Zhuang Ying as Wuluben

Soundtrack

Mainland Chinese

Hong Kong

Broadcast

References 

Television series by Tencent Penguin Pictures
Chinese historical television series
2020 Chinese television series debuts
2020 web series debuts
Chinese web series
Mandarin-language television shows